São Vicente de Minas is a municipality in the state of Minas Gerais in the Southeast region of Brazil.

Geography 
According to IBGE (2017), the municipality belongs to the Immediate Geographic Region of São João del-Rei, in the Intermediate Geographic Region of Barbacena.

Ecclesiastical circumscription 
The municipality is part of the Roman Catholic Diocese of São João del-Rei.

See also
List of municipalities in Minas Gerais

References

Municipalities in Minas Gerais